Zygmunt Kęstowicz (24 January 1921 – 14 March 2007) was a Polish actor. He appeared in more than 25 films and television shows between 1954 and 1997.

Selected filmography
 Shadow (1956)
 Stawka większa niż życie (1967)
 Klan soap opera playing Władysław Lubicz

References

External links

1921 births
2007 deaths
Deaths from cancer in Poland
Polish male film actors
20th-century Polish male actors
People from Šakiai
Polish male soap opera actors